David Simon (born August 9, 1982) is an American professional basketball player for Earth Friends Tokyo Z of the Japanese B.League. He also played his collegiate basketball for IPFW.

College career
In his first year as a college player, he averaged 10.6 points per game and 5.8 rebounds. At the end of the year he injured his left knee and went for surgery, but fully recovered for the next season. Before the second season at IPFW, he was ranked as the nation's second-best college center, behind Emeka Okafor of Connecticut. Also, he was named "Pre-Season Independent Player of the Year". Simon was also an All-American Candidate. He declared him eligible for the 2004 NBA draft without agent, but tore the ACL on his right knee during the Chicago Pre-Draft Camp and withdrew his name from the early entries into the draft and returned to school. He finished his last college season averaging 16.6 points and 6.9 rebounds.

College statistics

|-
| style="text-align:left;"| 2002-03
| style="text-align:left;"| IPFW
| 30 || NA || 23.1 || .580 || .000 || .651 || 5.8 || .7 || .4 || 1.3 || 10.6
|-
| style="text-align:left;"| 2003-04
| style="text-align:left;"| IPFW
| 28 || NA || 31.4 || .584 || 1.000 || .648 || 9.8 || 1.6 || .8 || 1.9 || 18.0
|-
| style="text-align:left;"| 2004-05
| style="text-align:left;"| IPFW
| 25 || NA || 32.1 || .523 || .077 || .633 || 6.9 || 2.0 || .8 || 1.9 || 16.6
|-class="sortbottom"
| style="text-align:left;"| Career
| style="text-align:left;"| 
| 83 || NA || 28.6 || .560 || .200 || .643 || 7.5 || 1.4 || .7 || 1.7 || 14.9

Professional career
Simon played for the Timberwolves at the NBA Summer League and at the New Jersey Nets mini camp. On 10 October 2005, Simon signed with Bulgarian club Lukoil Academic which participated in the ULEB Cup. In the mid of the season he said

I needed game like this one, to play well and show I can do well. After the end of ULEB Cup I would like to stay here and hopefully everything will be ok. For now I want to concentrate and play well in ULEB and Bulgarian championship as well.

In the Bulgarian league he averaged 11.4 points and 5.8 rebounds per game, while in the ULEB Cup he averaged 7.6 points and 7.8 rebounds for 25 minutes on the floor. He then, in 2006 signed for Russian club Standart Samarskiy Region and stayed for one season. Over 14 games in the Russian Super League, he averaged 11.1 points and 6.9 rebounds (7th in the league). However, he left the team midseason to go to France and Standart finished 13th and relegated into lower league.

He then played for French teams, both members of LNB Pro A League, Dijon and Strasbourg till 2010. For Dijon he played one game in Eurocup, where he scored 18 points, while for Strasbourg he played in EuroChallenge, the 3rd tier level transnational men's professional club basketball competition in Europe. Over 6 games he averaged 17.8 points and 8.3 rebounds. In 2010, he signed with the Anyang KGC of the Korean Basketball League where he would go on to make his first All-Star team.

In August 2011, Simon signed a one-year deal with Radnički Kragujevac. He was named Adriatic League MVP and was the league's top scorer, averaging 19.4 points and 6.5 rebounds per game.

On 11 June 2012, Simon signed a one-year contract with the Astana, along with Andreas Glyniadakis. In April 2013, he extended his contract for one more season.

On February 19, 2016, Simon was signed by Tropang TNT as the team's new import, replacing the suspended Ivan Johnson.

In April 2018, Simon was released from Anyang shortly after the KBL implemented a rule on foreign players. The KBL allows each team to have two foreign-born players on their rosters with neither taller than 200 centimeters. Simon was two centimeters over the limit. The move was made to combat declining league attendance .

European career statistics

Adriatic league

|-
| align="left" | 2011–12
| align="left" | Radnički
| 26 || 26 || 29.2 || .637 || .300 || .575 || 6.5 || 1.2 || 1.0 || 1.4 || 19.4 || 22.3
|-class="sortbottom"
| align="left" | Career
| align="left" |
| 26 || 26 || 29.2 || .637 || .300 || .575 || 6.5 || 1.2 || 1.0 || 1.4 || 19.4 || 22.3

References

External links
 David Simon at eurobasket.com
 David Simon at FIBA.com
 David Simon at abaliga.com

1982 births
Living people
20th-century African-American people
21st-century African-American sportspeople
ABA League players
African-American basketball players
American expatriate basketball people in Bulgaria
American expatriate basketball people in China
American expatriate basketball people in France
American expatriate basketball people in Japan
American expatriate basketball people in Kazakhstan
American expatriate basketball people in the Philippines
American expatriate basketball people in Russia
American expatriate basketball people in Serbia
American expatriate basketball people in South Korea
American men's basketball players
Anyang KGC players
Basketball players from Illinois
BC Astana players
Centers (basketball)
Earth Friends Tokyo Z players
Goyang Carrot Jumpers players
JDA Dijon Basket players
KK Radnički Kragujevac (2009–2014) players
Kyoto Hannaryz players
PBC Academic players
People from Vernon Hills, Illinois
Philippine Basketball Association imports
Purdue Fort Wayne Mastodons men's basketball players
Seoul SK Knights players
SIG Basket players
Sportspeople from the Chicago metropolitan area
TNT Tropang Giga players
Wonju DB Promy players